Sunnybrook (formerly, Vogans) is an unincorporated community in Amador County, California. It lies at an elevation of 784 feet (239 m).

The Vogans post office was operational from 1888 to 1889.

References

External links

Unincorporated communities in California
Unincorporated communities in Amador County, California